Volodymyr Mefodiyоvych Pylypchuk (born 18 June 1948, Hlynsk) is a Ukrainian politician, public figure, and savant. The parliamentarian of The Verkhovna Rada. Companion of the second- and third-class Order "For Merit". Member of the National Academy of Economic Sciences of Ukraine, professor.

Early life and education 
Volodymyr Pylypchuk was born on June 18, 1948 in the Hlynsk village of Zdolbuniv Raion of Rivne oblast of the Ukrainian SSR (now Ukraine) to Mefodiy and Neonila Pylypchuk.

After completing his secondary education at The Secondary School of Hlynsk, Pylypchuk studied at the Kyiv Technological Institute of Light Industry, from which he graduated in 1971 as an engineer.

 In the period from 1971 until 1982 Pylypchuk had worked as an engineer of the Kyiv start-and-adjustment bureau "Orgenergoavtomatika", a senior engineer, the head of the laboratory measuring technology and automation, a specialist The Lyubomyriv silicate plant, the chief specialist of the Rivne Regional Association of industrial and construction materials,  director of the Mogilyansk plant of drain tubes.

He had studied in the Scientific Research Institute of industrial and building materials USSR during 1982 and 1985 for the post-graduate work on his dissertation in Economics which he defended in 1985 receiving the degree of Candidate of Science (roughly Ph.D. equivalent).

A year later, Pylypchuk became a senior lector of economics at The Rivne National University of Water and Environmental Engineering.

He became a full member of the Academy of Economic Sciences of Ukraine in 1993.

In 1994 Pylypchuk studied at the Institute of Economics in. Boulder (Colorado, USA) training program of government leading cadres for Ukraine market economy.

Pylypchuk had been working as Professor of the Kyiv Institute of National Economy in period from 1991 and 1993 and as an academic adviser of Institute of  Mathematical Modelling in Economics.

Political career
In period from 1975 to 1990 Pylypchuk was the member of the Communist Party and left the Communist Party a year before the State Committee of the State of Emergency.
In the early 80's he was the deputy Ostrog District Council of People's Deputies (Rivne region).

Mr. Pylypchuk was one of the organizers of the socio-political organization of the People's Movement of Ukraine (Rukh) in 1989 and a member of the Economic Board and a member of the Great Council of Rukh, the Head of the Rukh's cell  in the Ukrainian Institute of Engineers of Water Management, The Head of Rivne regional organization People's Movement of Ukraine. He have not discontinue membership of Rukh.  After the disintegration of Rukh in protest against this processes, he has not joined any one of the parties (including the "fragments" Rukh).

In 1990 Pylypchuk was elected to the Rivne Regional Council of People's Deputies, but later gave up power due to the election of Chairman of the Permanent Commission of the Verkhovna Rada of Ukraine.

Pylypchuk was sworn into Ukrainian parliament on 1990. As an MP, he was the Member of the Presidium of Verkhovna Rada and the 
Chairman of the Standing Committee on economic reforms and national economy management.

In May 1995, Pylypchuk was elected to the second convocation of the parliament and serving his mandate until May 1998.

The Commission (in Soviet times) led by Pylypchuk were organized the development of the hryvnia design, the calculate of the amount of currency in circulation and the determine of the structure of denominations. He was an initiator of the creation in Ukraine of the production capability for the manufacture of new nation currency.

As an MP of the 1st convocation, he was the co-legislator and the initiator of the development by the Commission on economic reforms and management of national economy of 196 bils (114 of them were passed by Verkhovna Randa)/ there he participated in the finance and banking work group. These bills have focused on 	sovereignization Ukraine's economy and its simultaneous transformation to a market economy.

The following are the most important: 
 Declaration of State Sovereignty of Ukraine
 The Concept and Program of Ukraine's transition to a market economy;
 Resolution of the Verkhovna Rada of Ukraine on the introduction of the national currency - the hryvnia;
 The Law of Ukraine "On economic independence of Ukraine";
 Law of Property Act;
 The Law of Ukraine «On entrepreneurship»;
 The Law of Ukraine «On Securities and Stock Exchange»;
 The Law of Ukraine «On Banks and Banking Activity»;
 The Law of Ukraine «On Auditing»;
 Bankruptcy Law;
 The Law of Ukraine "On Pledge" (property);
 The Law of Ukraine «On rental property»;
 The Law of Ukraine «On Companies»;
 The Law of Ukraine "On concessions";
 The Law of Ukraine «On Foreign Economic Activity»;
 The Law of Ukraine «On Protection of Foreign Investments».

Commission under the Pylypchuk's leadership developed all anti-monopoly legislation, laws on the development of competition, anti-dumping and customs legislation. Prepared by Volodymyr Pylypchuk  Draft Law of Ukraine On privatization by subscribing to the property via a unified  computer network that excluded the voucher privatization scheme, interference in the privatization process and abused during her realization was not supported.

He was a member of the People's Council, the Minority( the structure of opposition to the ruling Communist "239 group") in the Verkhovna Rada of the 1st convocation.
Pylypchuk was  nominated twice for the post of Prime - Minister of Ukraine by People's Council and double candidature of Volodymyr Pylypchuk did not find the necessary number of votes.

1992-1994 - Member of the Parliamentary Assembly of the Organization for Security and Cooperation in Europe (OSCE PA), the PA OSCE parliamentarians twice elected vice-president of the OSCE PA General Committee on Economic Affairs, Science, Technology and Environment. He played on the PA OSCE reports at the Prague Economic Forum, at the Summit of Ministers of Economy of the EU in Edinburgh, at meetings of senior officials of the OSCE Parliamentary Assembly and European leaders in Malta at the General Committee of the OSCE Parliamentary Assembly in Budapest, Jack (Malta), Vienna and Helsinki . Served as expert "of seven" in Tokyo.

The aim of foreign policy efforts Pylypchuk were: recognition of Ukraine as an equal partner in international law, introducing a "climate" for Ukraine's integration into the international political and financial structures, removal towards Ukraine discriminatory restrictions in the international division of labor and getting her preferences.

As deputy to the 2nd convocation of the Verkhovna Rada, Volodymyr Pylypchuk independently developed the 28 draft laws, including 3 programs aimed at the surmounting economic crisis.

Volodymyr Pylypchuk actually retired but continues to engage in analytical activities ongoing economic and political situation in Ukraine. Nowadays he is well known as the author of a large number of analytical articles.

Mr. Pylypchuk has published more than 250 scientific papers and publications on macroeconomics and microeconomics, more than 30 times the presented reports at international conferences, including Harvard, Yale, Indianapolis, Toronto Universities, the Massachusetts Institute of Technology, as well as scientific and research institutions of Japan, France, Britain, Germany and Canada. Areas of research: "macro- and microeconomics." Sphere of scientific interests: the stability theories of the economy.

Personal life 
Father: Pylypchuk Mephodiy Tymonovych (1917-1989) was born and lived in Hlynsk, Rivne region. He worked as an agronomist at the collective farm 'Druzhba' in the village Hlyns. Mother: Pylypchuk Neonila Myronivna (1914-1987) was born and lived in the same village. During his lifetime - a housewife. Sister Galyna was born in 1937, education - agronomist. Brother Vasyl was born in 1956, is a mechanical engineer. Works in Portugal.

Married. First wife in life of Volodymyr Pylypchuk was Lidia Pylypchuk. Than Volodymyr married a second time to Larysa Pylypchuk, (b.1960) is a mathematics teacher of the highest category. There are three children: a daughter and two sons, five grandchildren and one grand-granddoughter. They all live, work and study in Ukraine.

Awards
During his public service Volodymyr Pylypchuk received numerous civil and state awards and recognition, including the Order of Merit, 3rd class (in 1998) and 2nd Class (in 2009).

References

External links
 Офіційна Україна. Пилипчук Володимир Мефодійович 
 "Регіонали" здають Росії газову трубу - економіст 
 Народный Комитет Защиты Украины считает недопустимым таможенный союз с Россией 
 Якщо Україна виграє міжнародний суд в Росії, то Тимошенко доведеться звільняти 
 Влада просто не розуміє, що на керівні посади треба підбирати розумних, а не особисто відданих 
 Україна може перетворитися у суб’єкт Російської Федерації
 Росія – рівноправний партнер? 
 Перші українські парламентарі закликають владу не розбазарювати національні надбання України 
 Депутаты первого созыва ВР призвали большинство Януковича не сдавать ГТС: "Это преступление перед народом Украины" 
 Україна може перетворитися у суб’єкт Російської Федерації 
 Звернення до депутатів парламентської більшості Верховної Ради України 6-го скликання  
 Депутати 1-го скликання закликають Верховну Раду не брати гріх на душу 
 Перші нардепи незалежної України закликали "регіоналів" здати мандати 
 Російська газотранспортна політика на межі краху   
 Найбільша загроза для Януковича — опозиція олігархів 
 Народ заслуговує того жалюгідного становища в якому він опинився. 
 Справжній професор — Володимир ПИЛИПЧУК 
 Народ заслуговує того жалюгідного становища в якому він опинився 
 Європа бажає, щоб Україна стала одним з локомотивів ЄС, а не причіпним вагоном 
 Ахметов починає орієнтуватися на бандерівців 

1948 births
Living people
People from Rivne Oblast
First convocation members of the Verkhovna Rada
Second convocation members of the Verkhovna Rada
Recipients of the Order of Merit (Ukraine), 2nd class
Recipients of the Order of Merit (Ukraine), 3rd class